Tony Koltz is an American writer. He wrote two Choose Your Own Adventure books: number 31, The Vampire Express, and number 59, Terror Island.

He wrote The Battle for Peace with General Anthony Zinni, and Battle Ready with Tom Clancy and General Zinni. His book on American foreign policy is Before the First Shots Are Fired: How America Can Win Or Lose Off The Battlefield (2014).

References 

Year of birth missing (living people)
Living people
Choose Your Own Adventure writers

American children's writers